Sound of Sexy Soul is the second studio album by American vocal group The Delfonics. It was released via Philly Groove Records in 1969. It peaked at number 155 on the Billboard 200 chart.

Track listing

Charts

References

External links
 

1969 albums
The Delfonics albums
Albums produced by Thom Bell
Albums arranged by Thom Bell
Philly Groove Records albums